The Roman Catholic Diocese of Ilhéus is a diocese located in the city of Ilhéus in the Ecclesiastical province of São Salvador da Bahia in Brazil.

History
On 20 October 1913 Pope Pius X established the Diocese of Ilhéus from the Metropolitan Archdiocese of São Salvador da Bahia.  It lost territory twice with the establishment of two other dioceses.  In 1962 Pope John XXIII established the Diocese of Caravelas and in 1978 Pope John Paul II established the Diocese of Itabuna

Bishops
 Bishops of Ilhéus (Roman rite), in reverse chronological order
 Bishop Giovanni Crippa I.M.C (2021.08.11 – present)
 Bishop Mauro Montagnoli, C.S.S. (1995.12.20 – 2021.08.11)
 Bishop Valfredo Bernardo Tepe, O.F.M. (1971.01.14 – 1995.07.05)
 Bishop Roberto Pinarello de Almeida (1970.04.18 – 1971.01.14)
 Bishop Caetano Antônio Lima dos Santos, O.F.M. Cap. (1958.04.16 – 1969.12.19)
 Bishop João Resende Costa, S.D.B. (1953.02.23 – 1957.07.19), appointed Coadjutor Archbishop of Belo Horizonte, Minas Gerais
 Bishop Benedito Zorzi (1946.08.03 – 1952.06.24)
 Bishop Felipe Benito Condurú Pacheco (1941.04.19 – 1946.02.07), appointed Bishop of Parnaíba, Piaui
 Bishop Eduardo José Herberhold, O.F.M. (1931.01.30 – 1939.07.24)
 Bishop Manoel Antônio de Paiva (1915.03.15 – 1929.04.02), appointed Bishop of Garanhuns, Pernambuco

Other priest of this diocese who became bishop
Cristiano Jakob Krapf, appointed Bishop of Jequié, Bahia

References

Roman Catholic dioceses in Brazil
Christian organizations established in 1913
Ilhéus, Roman Catholic Diocese of
Roman Catholic dioceses and prelatures established in the 20th century
1913 establishments in Brazil
Ilhéus